Jug End State Reservation and Wildlife Management Area is a public recreation area located in the towns of Egremont and Mount Washington, Massachusetts. The reservation occupies the site of the former Jug End Barn resort, which has been allowed to return to a natural state. Mount Everett State Reservation is adjacent to the south. It is managed by the Department of Conservation and Recreation.

History
The Jug End Barn ski resort operated under various owners from 1938 until its permanent closure in 1983. The state took control of the property in 1994, enacting a program of environmental remediation to return the property to a suitable condition for use by the public.

Activities and amenities
The Jug End Loop Trail passes through  of open fields, northern hardwood and eastern hemlock woodlands. A portion of the Appalachian Trail also crosses the property.

References

External links
Jug End State Reservation and WMA Department of Conservation and Recreation
Mt. Washington State Forest Map Department of Conservation and Recreation

State parks of Massachusetts
Parks in Berkshire County, Massachusetts
Egremont, Massachusetts
Mount Washington, Massachusetts
Protected areas established in 1994
1994 establishments in Massachusetts